Molteno is a town in Lombardy, Italy.

Molteno may also refer to:

Places
Molteno, South Africa
Molteno Pass, mountain pass near Beaufort West, South Africa

Other uses
Mbombini Molteno Sihele, Xhosa Councillor and national poet of the Thembu people
Molteno (surname), including several historical persons in the Italian diaspora
Molteno Brothers, farming enterprise and trust fund of Edward and Harry Molteno 
Molteno Institute for Language and Literacy, an NGO to combat illiteracy in Africa
Molteno Formation, a palaeontological formation in Southern Africa dating to the Upper Triassic
Molteno Dam, a historic dam in Cape Town, South Africa
Molteno Regulations, a system of grants, for open-to-all public libraries in South Africa